Michel Colomban (born 1932 in France) is a French aeronautical engineer known for his home-built aircraft. He originally worked for Morane-Saulnier on the Morane-Saulnier MS-880 (Rallye), and also later for Société Nationale d'Industrie Aérospatiale. He designed the Colomban Cri-cri in 1973. In the 1990s, he also designed the aluminium and composite Colomban MC-100 Ban-Bi, a two-seat aircraft that can reach  with an  engine.

References

French aerospace engineers
1932 births
Living people